Sarakina is a village and a community of the Grevena municipality. Before the 2011 local government reform it was a part of the municipality of Ventzio, of which it was a municipal district. The 2011 census recorded 177 residents in the village and 378 residents in the community. The community of Sarakina covers an area of 49.887 km2.

Administrative division
The community of Sarakina consists of three separate settlements: 
Diporo (population 85)
Neochori (population 116)
Sarakina (population 177)
The aforementioned population figures are as of 2011.

See also
 List of settlements in the Grevena regional unit

References

Populated places in Grevena (regional unit)